Sean McAslan (born January 12, 1980) is a Canadian former ice hockey who last played for the Nottingham Panthers in the UK.

Career

Early career
McAslan started his career in Calgary playing for Calgary Hitmen in Western Hockey League (WHL) for five seasons between 1996 and 2001. In 2001 he moved to the ECHL playing for Columbus Cottonmouths whilst having a brief stint in the American Hockey League (AHL) playing for Hamilton Bulldogs.

AHL and ECHL career
During the 2003–04 and 2004–05 McAslan played in the AHL for Toronto Roadrunners and Edmonton Roadrunners. He then moved to Long Beach Ice Dogs of the ECHL, scoring 28 goals and 28 assists making 56 points in total, whilst spending 106 minutes in the penalty box. He also had another brief stint in the AHL with Milwaukee Admirals playing two regular season games and 14 playoff games.

EIHL career
In 2006 McAslan signed for the Nottingham Panthers of the EIHL, scoring 44 goals and 22 assists. He also made the EIHL second All Star team. Season 2007–08 was also spent with the Nottingham Panthers and he was made captain by coach Mike Ellis during a pre-season tour of France, winning the Epinal Tournament. Later in the season he lifted the Elite League's Challenge Cup beating their arch rivals, the Sheffield Steelers, 9–7 over two legs.  He left the Panthers at the end of the 2007/08 season to join Rodovre in the Danish League. In May 2009 it was announced that McAslan would return to the Nottingham Panthers to join their 09/10 championship campaign declaring that he had 'unfinished business' with British Ice Hockey's best supported outfit.

Career statistics

External links

1980 births
Living people
Calgary Hitmen players
Columbus Cottonmouths (ECHL) players
Hamilton Bulldogs (AHL) players
Ice hockey people from Alberta
Long Beach Ice Dogs (ECHL) players
Milwaukee Admirals players
Nottingham Panthers players
People from Foothills County
Rødovre Mighty Bulls players
Toronto Roadrunners players
Canadian ice hockey right wingers